Mullan is a city in the northwest United States, located in the Silver Valley mining district of northern Idaho. The population was 646 at the 2020 census and 692 at the 2010 census, and 840 in 2000.

History
Mullan came into existence  in 1884 with the discovery of gold at the Gold Hunter Mine, which turned out to be a lead and silver producer. That same year, George Good made a lead-silver strike with the Morning Mine and Mullan came into existence between the two mines. The site was filed in August 1888, after the village had twenty log and fifteen frame houses, a sawmill, and a population of 150. The Northern Pacific Railway arrived in 1889 and the city was incorporated in 1904.

During the Coeur d'Alene labor confrontation of 1899, two hundred miners from Mullan joined the Dynamite Express. In the aftermath of the labor war, many of Mullan's leaders and Populist elected officials including the sheriff were arrested and sent to the Wallace bull pens.

The city was named for West Point graduate John Mullan  who was in charge of selecting a wagon route (commonly called the Mullan Road) between Fort Benton (Montana) and Fort Walla Walla (Washington). Lieutenant Mullan, a topographical engineer in the U.S. Army, began gathering information in 1854.  Delayed by the Coeur d'Alene War of 1858, construction began in 1859 from Fort Walla Walla.

After the strenuous project was completed in 1860, floods wiped out substantial stretches of the road, and the road was re-routed in 1861. Floods again damaged the road, and ultimately, no provision for maintenance was provided.

Mullan's population has declined in recent decades, from a peak of 2,291 in 1940.

Present day
Mullan is significantly smaller than it was in the heyday of the Morning and Lucky Friday mines. The Mullan School District operates the John Mullan Elementary School (K–6) and the Mullan Junior/Senior High School  opened  in 1927.

Mullan has its own fire department and owns and maintains an Olympic-size swimming pool for community use. The city is accessed from Interstate 90 at exits 67, 68, and 69.

Geography

Climate
According to the Köppen climate classification system, Mullan has a humid continental climate (Köppen Dfb) with four full seasons. Summers are generally warm, with cool nights, while winters are cold and snowy, with annual snowfall averaging 112 inches (284 cm).

Demographics

2010 census
As of the census of 2010, there were 692 people, 326 households, and 193 families residing in the city. The racial makeup of the city was 95.8% White, 1.0% Native American, 0.1% Asian, 0.1% Pacific Islander, 0.7% from other races, and 2.2% from two or more races. Hispanic or Latino of any race were 2.2% of the population.

There were 326 households, of which 20.2% had children under the age of 18 living with them, 46.3% were married couples living together, 8.0% had a female householder with no husband present, 4.9% had a male householder with no wife present, and 40.8% were non-families. 36.5% of all households were made up of individuals, and 18.1% had someone living alone who was 65 years of age or older. The average household size was 2.12 and the average family size was 2.72.

The median age in the city was 48.3 years. 17.9% of residents were under the age of 18; 6.8% were between the ages of 18 and 24; 20.9% were from 25 to 44; 33.8% were from 45 to 64; and 20.5% were 65 years of age or older. The gender makeup of the city was 51.9% male and 48.1% female.

2000 census
As of the census of 2000, there were 840 people, 367 households, and 227 families residing in the city. The racial makeup of the city was 96.31% White, 1.43% Native American, 0.24% Asian, 1.19% from other races, and 0.83% from two or more races. Hispanic or Latino of any race were 2.86% of the population.

There were 367 households, out of which 28.1% had children under the age of 18 living with them, 51.2% were married couples living together, 6.8% had a female householder with no husband present, and 37.9% were non-families. 32.4% of all households were made up of individuals, and 13.9% had someone living alone who was 65 years of age or older.  The average household size was 2.29 and the average family size was 2.91.

In the city, the population was spread out, with 24.9% under the age of 18, 5.6% from 18 to 24, 25.2% from 25 to 44, 27.5% from 45 to 64, and 16.8% who were 65 years of age or older.  The median age was 41 years. For every 100 females, there were 101.4 males.  For every 100 females age 18 and over, there were 100.3 males.

The median income for a household in the city was $30,417, and the median income for a family was $36,917. Males had a median income of $31,250 versus $20,833 for females. The per capita income for the city was $14,943.  About 7.8% of families and 12.1% of the population were below the poverty line, including 19.2% of those under age 18 and 9.6% of those age 65 or over.

See also
 List of cities in Idaho
 Lookout Pass Ski and Recreation Area

References

Further reading
 Conley, Cort.  Idaho for the Curious.  Cambridge: Backeddy, 1982, 451–53, 493–95.

External links

 Mullan School District
 University of Idaho Library - various images of early Mullan
 University of Washington Libraries - various images of early Mullan
 Spokane Journal of Commerce - Lucky Friday mine to expand - 13-Sep-2007
 Hecla Mining.com - Lucky Friday mine - Mullan

Cities in Idaho
Cities in Shoshone County, Idaho